Trichareva is a genus of moths in the subfamily Arctiinae. It contains the single species Trichareva fulvilaniata, which is found in Panama and Costa Rica.

References

Natural History Museum Lepidoptera generic names catalog

Lithosiini